The 1872–73 Football Association Challenge Cup was the second staging of the FA Cup, England's oldest national football tournament.  Sixteen teams entered, one more than the previous season, although two of the sixteen never actually played a match.  

In keeping with the original concept of it being a "challenge" cup, the holders, Wanderers, were given a bye all the way to the final, for which they were also allowed to select the venue.  This was the only season in which the holders were granted these privileges.

Queen's Park were given byes until the semi-finals in order to reduce the amount of travelling necessary, but then withdrew anyway when scheduled to play Oxford University, who therefore received a walkover to the final.

Format
First Round: 14 teams (all except Queen's Park and defending champions Wanderers) would play, each match eliminating the loser.

Second Round: 6 teams (Royal Engineers getting a bye) would play, the winners advancing.

Third Round: The 3 winners and Royal Engineers would play. The winners would advance.

Fourth Round: The two remaining teams from the Third Round would play, the winner facing Queen's Park.

Semi-Final: The Fourth Round team would face Queen's Park. However, this was not needed as Queen's Park withdrew.

Final: The Semi-Final team would face Wanderers, the defending champion.

Calendar

First round

Second round

Notes

Third round

Fourth round

Semi-final

Final

As the 1871–72 Cup winners, Wanderers had not played in the cup before this game.

The final was played at Lillie Bridge. The attendance of 3,000 was considered low, and of those who did attend, not all stayed for the whole duration of the game. This was attributed to the Boat Race occurring later the same day.

References

Competition Results at rsssf.com
Competition Results at Soccerbase

1872–73
FA Cup
FA Cup